Claude Picard (born 29 December 1938) is a French sprint canoeist who competed in the late 1960s. He was eliminated in the semifinals of the K-4 1000 m event at the 1968 Summer Olympics in Mexico City.

References
Sports-reference.com profile

1938 births
Canoeists at the 1968 Summer Olympics
French male canoeists
Living people
Olympic canoeists of France
Place of birth missing (living people)